was a Japanese professional sumo wrestler from Ehime Prefecture, Japan. He is the second wrestler to bear the shikona, or ring name, Asashio. He became the stablemaster of Takasago stable in 1915 while still active, and continued to run the stable after his retirement in 1919 until 1941, when he passed on the Takasago elder share to then ōzeki Maedayama. He died in 1962 at the age of 82.

Early life and career
Asashio was born in Saijō in the Ehime Prefecture. At the age of 20, it is said he had the strength to lift a load nearly three times his body weight, and was expected to become a sumo wrestler. He entered the Takasago stable and became the protege of coach Sanoyama (former ōzeki Asashio). He entered his first tournament in 1901 under the shikona, or ring name,  but was later given the name , the former ring name of his mentor, when he was promoted to sekiwake.
He was a popular wrestler because he had the appearance of an ancient samurai and a sportsman attitude in the ring. He was so strong with his right hand grip that he earned the nickname , 'right-hand grip worth fifty thousand koku'. On the ninth day of the 1914 Summer tournament, he fought the unbeaten yokozuna Tachiyama. After a heated battle, Asashio collapsed on his torso and had to be placed under medical observation. Therefore the bout ended on a hold costing the tournament to Tachiyama. This match was highly regarded and Asashio was promoted to ōzeki after the tournament. As a makuuchi wrestler, Asashio had a record of 98 victories, 64 losses, 25 draws and 7 holds in twenty-six tournaments (including ten as ōzeki).

Retirement from sumo
In 1913, he had a dispute with another apprentice  over who should succeed former sekiwake Takamiyama as stablemaster. The dispute ended up in court, but Asashio won the case and assumed the elder name Takasago under a two-name license, allowing him to run the stable and participate to tournaments as a wrestler. After retiring from the ring, he devoted himself to running his stable as the third generation Takasago. He trained yokozuna Minanogawa and Maedayama. In 1929 Akutsugawa, a former wrestler and coach at Takasago stable, encouraged Minanogawa to join his newly established Sadogatake stable. However Asashio did not want his promising rikishi to leave the stable and even proposed to change Minanogawa's shikona to his own of Asashio to obligate him to stay. Eventually a compromise was worked out and Minanogawa divided his time between the two stables. In December 1941, he handed over his stable and title to Maedayama. In 1950, at Maedayama's retirement ceremony, he made the final cut in the ōichōmage as a former stablemaster. Asashio died April 30 , 1961 at the age of 82.A stone monument was erected in the premises of the Omachi's Saijō shrine, in his hometown of Saijō, Ehime.

Top Division Record

See also
Glossary of sumo terms
List of past sumo wrestlers
List of ōzeki

References

1879 births
1961 deaths
Japanese sumo wrestlers
Sumo people from Ehime Prefecture